The Bøvra, also known as the Bævra, is a river in the municipality of Surnadal in Møre og Romsdal county and in the municipalities of Rindal and Heim in Trøndelag county, Norway.

After regulation of the river, salmon fishing has been limited to downstream from the Svorka power station. In 1986 salmon flukes, a parasite, were detected and the river was treated with rotenone in 1986 and 1989. After the treatment, the river was reopened for fishing in 1994. In addition to salmon, sea trout also travel up the river.

The lower part of the Bøvra Valley is a U-shaped valley and the course of the river creates meanders.

The watercourse was regulated in 1963 and it has several power stations along it, including the Svorka Power Station. Due to the regulation, water flow was reduced in two tributaries, the Svorka and Litlbævra (or Lille-Bøvra). Around 43% of the river's catchment area is used for the Svorka Power Station. The Nordsvorka Power Station came into operation in 2007. The water flow in the upper part of the river between the mouth of the Litlbævra and the Svorka Power Station has also been greatly reduced as a result of regulation.

According to Amund Helland, the fjord was formerly called Bifrafjǫrðr after the river, which was formerly called Bifr.

See also
List of rivers in Norway

References

Rivers of Møre og Romsdal
Rivers of Trøndelag
Surnadal
Heim, Norway
Rindal
Rivers of Norway